The Lioré-et-Olivier LeO 48 was a French experimental aircraft that was built early in World War II.

Specifications (LeO 48)

References

1940s French experimental aircraft
48
Aircraft first flown in 1941
Twin piston-engined tractor aircraft